John Alexander Forrest (born 24 August 1949) is a former Australian politician who served as a National Party member of the Australian House of Representatives from March 1993 until August 2013, representing the Division of Mallee in Victoria. He was born in Mildura, and was educated at University of Melbourne and the University of Aberdeen in Scotland. Before entering politics he was a design engineer with the State Electricity Commission of Victoria, a lecturer at Ballarat College of Advanced Education, and a member of the Rural City of Swan Hill council.

Forrest was one of the initial members of the Lyons Forum, a conservative parliamentary ginger group.

Forrest announced his retirement on 6 March 2013, stating that he would not contest the 2013 federal election.

References

External links
Personal website
John Forrest MP at the House of Representatives website

1949 births
Living people
National Party of Australia members of the Parliament of Australia
People from Mildura
University of Melbourne alumni
Members of the Australian House of Representatives
Members of the Australian House of Representatives for Mallee
Academic staff of the Federation University Australia
Alumni of the University of Aberdeen
21st-century Australian politicians
20th-century Australian politicians